Aminata Kabba (born 13 December 1994), better known by her stage name KABBA, formerly known as A*M*E, is a British singer and songwriter. KABBA was born in Freetown, Sierra Leone, on 13 December 1994. In 2011, Amy was scouted and signed by Take That frontman Gary Barlow to his label, Future Records.

On 9 December 2012, the BBC announced that KABBA - then A*M*E - had been nominated for the Sound of 2013 poll.

In January 2013, Amy signed to Sony Music's Epic Records after Barlow closed Future Records to focus on his own career commitments. The Duke Dumont single "Need U (100%)", featuring A*M*E and MNEK, topped the UK Singles Chart on 7 April 2013.

Biography

1994–2011: Early life
At the age of eight, Amy moved to the United Kingdom after her mother's hair salon was burned to the ground and life in Sierra Leone became too dangerous. Growing up in the Catford area of south-east London, Amy was introduced to fellow teenage prodigy MNEK. The pair bonded over a mutual love of '90s pop music and started collaborating, quickly creating a handful of songs including "City Lights". The track was enough to pique the interest of Take That frontman Gary Barlow, who proceeded to sign her to his Future record label.

2012–2018: Career beginnings: A*M*E
In 2012, KABBA released a string of promotional singles called "City Lights" (featuring Bartoven), "Ride or Die" and "Find a Boy", which she co-wrote alongside Emeli Sandé and producer Naughty Boy.

It was announced by The Guardian in September 2012 that Amy would release her first commercial single, "Play The Game Boy", in November 2012. Produced by Electric, the track attained positive reviews, with Digital Spy listing the song as one of its 'Top 10 tracks You Need to Hear'; commenting on "[its] insanely addictive choruses and K-pop inspired melodies" and that "it feels fresher than anything else on this week's chart."

On 9 December 2012, the BBC announced that Amy had been nominated for the Sound of 2013 poll alongside the likes of Angel Haze and The Weeknd.

Her collaboration with Duke Dumont, "Need U (100%)" was released in March 2013. It became both acts' most successful single at the time, debuting at No.1 and remaining there for 2 weeks, and earned her a nomination in the Best Dance Recording category at the 56th Annual GRAMMY Awards.

On 14 July 2014, Amy released her second official single, "Heartless", produced by Carl Falk and Rami Yacoub. She also featured on Monsieur Adi's single "What's Going On?", CamelPhat's "Paradigm", MK's "My Love 4 U", Tough Love's "Closer to Love", Shift K3Y's "Entirety", as well as appearing on M-22's "White Lies".

2019–present: KABBA and debut EP

Through an Instagram post on 8 July 2019, Amy announced that she would rebrand as KABBA.

KABBA announced the first single from her self titled debut EP on 12 July 2019. It is titled "Glue" and features Bartoven, who previously appeared on her song "City Lights". The song was first premiered on COMPLEX on 24 July 2019. In the article, KABBA explained the reasons behind her rebrand, stating: "KABBA is a Sierra Leonean name and part of my identity that is so precious to me. Now that I'm entering a new phase in my career, I'm free to fully embrace KABBA."

Her debut EP KABBA was released on 14 February 2020.

Discography

Extended plays

Singles

As lead artist

As featured artist

Promotional singles

Guest appearances

Songwriting credits

Music videos

Artistry

Influences
Amy has been heavily influenced by K-pop, saying "I love my K-pop, but I haven't really done anything with that sound yet. There's influences from it in my music – I've got some fat, solid, six-part melodies which are very K-poppy." Amy cites Beyoncé, Jimmy Jam and Terry Lewis and Big Bang as her influences, she also cites Janet Jackson as a major influence calling Jackson her idol.

Awards and nominations

References

1994 births
Living people
Sierra Leonean women singers
21st-century Black British women singers
Sierra Leonean emigrants to the United Kingdom
Singers from London
English house musicians
English women pop singers
People from Freetown